Entrophospora is a genus of fungi in the family Acaulosporaceae of the Glomeromycota. The name is derived from the Greek words en (within), trophos (nourished or reared), and spora (spore). The generic description was emended in 2011.

References

External links

Diversisporales
Fungus genera